Cyrtojana is a monotypic moth genus in the family Eupterotidae. Its only species, Cyrtojana trilineata, is found in South Africa. Both the genus and species were described by Per Olof Christopher Aurivillius in 1911.

References

Endemic moths of South Africa
Moths described in 1911
Eupterotinae